Shin Jae-ho (born November 21, 1993), better known by his stage name Microdot, is a Korean–New Zealand rapper and singer. He debuted as a member of duo All Black, with Dok2, in 2006. He has also appeared on Show Me the Money, Unpretty Rapstar, and Tribe of Hip Hop.

Early life
Microdot was born on November 21, 1993, South Korea, and is the younger brother of the rapper Sanchez. He emigrated to Auckland, New Zealand, at the age of five.

Filmography

Television Shows

Discography

Collaborative albums

Extended plays

Singles

References

External links

1993 births
Living people
South Korean male rappers
South Korean hip hop singers
21st-century South Korean  male singers
South Korean emigrants to New Zealand